Events from the year 1803 in Sweden

Incumbents
 Monarch – Gustav IV Adolf

Events

 - The land reform Enskiftet is enforced in all Scania. 
 - The Yellow Rose (society) is exposed and banned by the monarch, leading to the end of all secret masonic lodges at the royal court.

Births
 8 June - Amalia Assur, first female dentist  (died 1889)
 16 May – Amelie von Strussenfelt, writer  (died 1847)
 25 November – Sofia Ahlbom, artist  (died 1868)
 26 November – Wilhelmina Stålberg, writer  (died 1886)
 – Evelina Stading, painter  (died 1872)
 – Isak Albert Berg, singer, composer  (died 1886)

Deaths
 1 February – Anders Chydenius, leading classical liberal of Nordic history (born 1729)
 12 December - Prince Frederick Adolf of Sweden, prince  (born 1750)
 27 August - Peter Gustaf Tengmalm, naturalist   (born 1754)
 - Erika Liebman, poet and scholar   (born 1738)

References

 
Years of the 19th century in Sweden